Mladen Kukrika (born 11 January 1991) is a Bosnian professional football goalkeeper who plays for S.K. Victoria Wanderers F.C.

Club career
Kukrika began his career in his native country with Leotar in the Bosnian Premier League. In 2014, he played abroad in the Albanian First Division with Kastrioti. In 2015, he went overseas to Canada to sign with Scarborough SC of the Canadian Soccer League. Ahead of the 2019–20 season, Kukrika joined Swedish Prespa Birlik in the Division 2 Västra Götaland. In January 2020, he signed with Borac Banja Luka. Kukrika left Borac on 22 August 2020.

On 12 October 2020, he signed a one-year contract with First League of FBiH club GOŠK Gabela. He made his official debut for GOŠK five days later, on 17 October, in a league win against Slaven Živinice. In 2022, he played in the Gozo Football League First Division with S.K. Victoria Wanderers F.C.

References

External links

1991 births
Living people
People from Trebinje
Serbs of Bosnia and Herzegovina
Association football goalkeepers
Bosnia and Herzegovina footballers
FK Leotar players
KS Kastrioti players
Scarborough SC players
FK Željezničar Banja Luka players
NK Metalleghe-BSI players
KSF Prespa Birlik players
FK Borac Banja Luka players
NK GOŠK Gabela players
Premier League of Bosnia and Herzegovina players
Kategoria Superiore players
Canadian Soccer League (1998–present) players
First League of the Federation of Bosnia and Herzegovina players
Division 2 (Swedish football) players
Bosnia and Herzegovina expatriate footballers
Bosnia and Herzegovina expatriate sportspeople in Albania
Expatriate footballers in Albania
Bosnia and Herzegovina expatriate sportspeople in Canada
Expatriate soccer players in Canada
Bosnia and Herzegovina expatriate sportspeople in Sweden
Expatriate footballers in Sweden
Gozo Football League First Division players